Constance of York, Countess of Gloucester ( – 28 November 1416) was the only daughter of Edmund of Langley, 1st Duke of York, and his wife Isabella of Castile, daughter of King Peter of Castile and his favourite mistress, María de Padilla.

Family

Constance was born in about 1375, the only daughter of Edmund of Langley, 1st Duke of York, and his wife, Isabella of Castile, the youngest daughter of King Peter of Castile and his mistress, María de Padilla.

Plots against Henry IV
Constance married Thomas le Despenser, 1st Earl of Gloucester, who was created Earl of Gloucester by King Richard II on 29 September 1397, but after Richard's deposition and the accession of King Henry IV some of Thomas's lands were seized and he was degraded from the earldom. In consequence, he and others joined in a plot in December 1399 (known as the Epiphany Rising) to assassinate King Henry and restore King Richard to the throne. According to a French chronicle, the plot was betrayed to the King by Constance's brother, Edward; however contemporary English chronicles make no mention of Edward's alleged role. Gloucester escaped immediate capture, but was eventually turned in to the authorities at Bristol, where he was beheaded on 13 January 1400. After her husband's death, Constance was granted a life interest in the greater part of his lands and custody of her son due her close kinship to the king.

In February 1405, during the rebellion of Owain Glyndŵr, Constance herself instigated a plot to abduct the young Edmund Mortimer, 5th Earl of March, and his brother, Roger Mortimer, from Windsor Castle, apparently intending to deliver the young Earl, who had the best claim to the throne of any of Henry IV's rivals, to his uncle Sir Edmund Mortimer, who was married to Glyndwr's daughter.  The young Edmund Mortimer and his brother were recaptured before entering Wales. Constance implicated her elder brother, Edward, in the plot, as a result of which he was imprisoned for 17 weeks at Pevensey Castle, but was eventually restored to Henry IV's favour as well as the seized property of Constance who had been sent to Kenilworth Castle.

Constance died in 1416 after the accession of Henry V, outliving both her siblings, but she was buried at the High Altar in Reading Abbey as late as 1420.

Marriage and issue
Shortly before 7 November 1397 Constance married Thomas le Despenser, 1st Earl of Gloucester (1373–1400), third but first surviving son of Edward le Despenser and Elizabeth Burghersh, by whom she had a son and two daughters:

Richard le Despenser, 4th Baron Burghersh (1396–1414). He married Lady Eleanor Neville (c. 1397 – 1472), daughter of Ralph de Neville, 1st Earl of Westmorland (d. 1425) and Joan Beaufort (d. 1440), daughter of John of Gaunt by Katherine Swynford. He died young without issue.
Elizabeth (died young c. 1398).
Isabel, born after her father's execution. She married, firstly, Richard Beauchamp, Earl of Worcester (d. 1422). A daughter, Elizabeth, Lady Abergavenny (b. 1415) was the sole product of this union. Following Worcester's death, she married Richard de Beauchamp, 13th Earl of Warwick; they were parents to Henry Beauchamp, 1st Duke of Warwick and Anne Beauchamp, 16th Countess of Warwick.

After her husband's death, Constance was either betrothed to or lived as the mistress of Edmund Holland, 4th Earl of Kent (1383–1408), by whom she had an illegitimate daughter, Eleanor Holland, who married James Tuchet, 5th Baron Audley (died 1459).

Ancestry

Footnotes

References

 

 
 
 

: Dictionary of National Biography, 1885–1900, Volume 45
Liss, Peggy K., Isabel the Queen, New York: Oxford University Press, 1992.
Reston, James, Dogs of God, New York: Doubleday, 2005.

1370s births
1416 deaths
Constance of York, Countess of Gloucester
English countesses
Burials at Reading Abbey
Daughters of English dukes
English people of French descent
English people of German descent
English people of Portuguese descent
People from Conisbrough
Date of birth unknown
14th-century English people
14th-century English women
15th-century English people
15th-century English women
Wives of knights